Heliu could refer to the following locations in China:

 Heliu, Anhui (河溜镇), town in Huaiyuan County
 Heliu, Shandong (河流镇), town in Yangxin County